Jim Messina may refer to:

 Jim Messina (musician) (born 1947), American
 Jim Messina (political staffer) (born 1969), American